This is a list of seasons played by Tottenham Hotspur Football Club in English football, from the year they first began league play, in 1896 in the Southern League, to the present day. It details the club's record in first class competitions, and the top scorers for each season. Records of exhibitions and minor competitions such as the London Senior Cup are not included.

The club has won the Southern League once, the London League once, the Western League once, the League Championship twice, the FA Cup eight times, the League Cup four times, the Charity Shield four times outright and three times shared, the Southern Charity Cup twice outright and once shared, the London Professional Football Charity Fund match eleven times outright and twice shared, the London FA Charity Cup twice, the European Cup Winners' Cup once, the UEFA Cup twice, and the Anglo-Italian League Cup-Winners' Cup once.

Top scorers in bold were also the top scorers in the top flight of the English league system. From 1993, this player was awarded the Premier League Golden Boot.

Seasons

Key

Footnotes

References

Seasons
 
English football club seasons